There are three types of Hybrid SaaSmodel; the traditional Hybris SaaS model, The HomeBrew Hybrid SaaS model and the Next Generation of Hybrid SaaS solutions.

Traditional Hybrid SaaS model
The traditional Hybrid SaaS model is where the customer may deploy the software as a SaaS service or as on-premises solution, with the ability to switch from one to the other as needed.

This model has arisen in response to the drawbacks of the pure SaaS model and is claimed by proponents to provide the advantages of the SaaS model, while mitigating the potential drawbacks. For example, the hybrid model allows companies to move the system in-house when:

 They need to store highly sensitive information and are concerned that SaaS providers might be socially engineered
 They need tight integration with sensitive back-end systems and this is either technically impossible with a remote system, or their IT department is unwilling to create holes in the firewall that would permit an outside server to initiate actions on internal systems.
 They need to transfer large files and cannot afford the delay that results from the typical Internet connectivity speeds of 100kbs - 1000kbs, as compared to internal Ethernet speeds of up to 1,000,000kbs.
 They are concerned about the long term financial viability of their SaaS vendor.
 They need to modify the core software itself.
 They would rather pay a lump sum than monthly hosting charges.

There are corresponding arguments against this model. For example, the software provider must design the product to support both in-house installation and its use as a hosted service.

HomeBrew’ Hybrid SaaS model

The ‘HomeBrew’ Hybrid SaaS model, where a customer uses functionality from both the cloud via SaaS, combined with a more traditional solution on-premises. Both solutions are operational at the same time, unlike the traditional hybrid SaaS model detailed above. This kind of model would most typically be used for content security solutions with transient data already on the ‘public’ internet, such as email traffic. The chief benefit of this type of solution is that a high percentage of content can be removed before they reach the premises of the customer, reducing hardware and bandwidth requirements. The main disadvantages are that two disparate solutions are in use, which means two management consoles to monitor and configure the solutions, as well as two sets of licence/subscription costs.

Next Generation of Hybrid SaaS solutions
The Next Generation of Hybrid SaaS solutions are just becoming available. They extend the HomeBrew hybrid SaaS model to include interoperating solutions situated both on the customer’s premises, as well as located within the cloud, therefore building on the strengths of the homebrew model and removing many of the drawbacks.

Typically, the cloud component is located within a managed datacentre operated by a service provider, who would often also be the vendor of the on-premises solution. As per the homebrew hybrid SaaS model, both solutions are operational at the same time. However, the main difference is that the solutions are not disparate – links exist between the on-premises solution and the cloud platform in order to mitigate the drawbacks of the Homebrew Hybrid solution. Examples of these links may be the retrieval of log information - the administrator can login to a single console and see consolidated information returned from both the cloud platform and the on-premises solution in a single report. Another example may be the ability to configure both the cloud platform and the local solution from one console, with the hybrid component appearing as a ‘seamlessly integrated’ part of the solution.

As both solutions are often from a single vendor, the cost of licensing is often much less than a solution based on both a cloud component and an on-premises solution combined.

References 

Software distribution